The Timothy Plan is an American mutual fund company headquartered in Maitland, Florida that promotes their products as being the first investments of their type to utilize Biblically based screens as the first criteria in the selection of its investment portfolios of companies. The company was founded in 1994 by Arthur Ally, formerly of Lehman Brothers, who wanted to cater retirement investments to socially conservative Christian American pastors. The company states they are non-Demominational Christian in orientation and their name is taken from passages in Timothy 1. Arthur Ally, authored Invested with Purpose, the story of The Timothy Plan and how one man's vision had led to a revolution: Biblically Responsible Investing. 

The fund family avoids companies that support or profit from abortion, pornography, gambling, alcohol and tobacco production, violations of child labor laws, supporting terrorist nations as defined by the US Government, or entertainment, lifestyles or marriages the company perceives as contrary to Biblical principles. The fund family is categorized as Biblically responsible investment (BRI). Its ultimate goal is to provide an alternative investment that allows Christian and socially conservative investors to align their investment portfolio with their beliefs.  Timothy Plan constantly monitors the holdings in its investment portfolios to determine if any of the companies have changed their policies and procedures subsequent to being placed into the portfolio.

Funds
Funds offered by Timothy Plan (classes A, C and I) are listed on the New York Stock Exchange (NYSE):

The Timothy Plan Mutual Funds

The Timothy Plan Exchange Traded Funds (ETFs)

The class I shares are offered exclusively through registered investment advisors.

See also 
 Ave Maria Mutual Funds
 Faith-based investing

References

External links
 Official website

Mutual funds of the United States
Ethical investment
Financial services companies established in 1994